The Macon and Western Railroad was an American railway company that operated in Georgia in the middle of the 19th century. Originally chartered as the Monroe Railroad and Banking Company in December 1833, it was not until 1838 that it opened for business with a  gauge line from Macon, Georgia Northwest to Forsyth.  It was extended to Griffin in 1842. An economic depression halted building, but when the railroad started building again, it managed only another  towards Atlanta for a total of  before falling into bankruptcy.

It was bought in foreclosure and the name was changed to the Macon and Western Railroad in 1845. This railroad was purchased by the Central Railroad and Banking Company of Georgia in 1872.

The stops available to riders in 1867 were:

Distances of depots from Atlanta 

Trains departed from Atlanta at 7:15AM and 8:15PM and arrived there at 2:00PM and 4:35PM.

References 

5 ft gauge railways in the United States
Defunct Georgia (U.S. state) railroads
Predecessors of the Central of Georgia Railway
Railway companies established in 1845
Railway companies disestablished in 1872
Railway lines in Atlanta
American companies established in 1845
American companies disestablished in 1872